The Braille pattern dots-0, also called a blank Braille pattern, is a 6-dot or 8-dot braille cell with no dots raised. It is represented by the Unicode code point U+2800, and in Braille ASCII with a space.

Unified Braille

In all braille systems, the braille pattern dots-0 is used to represent a space or the lack of content. In particular some fonts display the character as a fixed-width blank. However, the Unicode standard explicitly states that it does not act as a space, a statement added in response to a comment that it should be treated as a space.

Plus dots 7 and 8

Related to Braille pattern dots-0 are Braille patterns 7, 8, and 78, which are used in 8-dot braille systems, such as Gardner-Salinas and Luxembourgish Braille.

Notes

Braille patterns